Wandering Girls is a 1927 American silent film directed by Ralph Ince and starring Dorothy Revier,  Eugenie Besserer and Frances Raymond.

Cast
 Dorothy Revier as Peggy Marston  
 Eugenie Besserer as Peggy's Mother  
 Frances Raymond as Mrs. Arnold  
 Robert Agnew as Jerry Arnold 
 William Welsh as James Marston 
 Armand Kaliz as Maurice Dumond 
 Mildred Harris as Maxine

References

Bibliography
 Quinlan, David. The Illustrated Guide to Film Directors. Batsford, 1983.

External links

1927 films
Films directed by Ralph Ince
American silent feature films
1920s English-language films
American black-and-white films
Columbia Pictures films
1920s American films